Gossypiothallon is a fungal genus of uncertain familial placement in the order Arthoniales. It contains the single species Gossypiothallon appendisporum, a corticolous (bark-dwelling), crustose lichen found in South Solomons. Both the genus and species were described as new to science in 2014 by Dutch lichenologist André Aptroot.

The lichen has a white, crustose thallus lacking a cortex, and with a cottony (byssoid) texture. The ascomata have a pedicel and have pale pink  that lack differentiated margins. The ascospores, which number eight per ascus, are hyaline, rod-shaped, and have 3 septa; their dimensions are 20–22 by 5.5–6.5 μm. They have two polar, gelatinous appendages that are typically curved. The thallus contains zeorin, a lichen product detectable using thin-layer chromatography. Both the thallus and ascomata do not show any reaction with standard chemical spot tests (i.e., C–, P–, and K–).

References

Arthoniomycetes
Lichen genera
Arthoniomycetes genera
Taxa described in 2014
Taxa named by André Aptroot